Ledges is the full-length solo debut album by Noah Gundersen. It was self-produced and recorded at Stone Gossard's Studio Litho in Seattle. It was released on February 11, 2014. The track "Poor Man's Son" features Gundersen's sister Abby and brother Jonathan on various instruments.

The first two recordings of the album were abandoned in favor of a self-produced version.

Ledges has been described as "calculated and unyielding, somersaulting its way around a menagerie of heavy, yet unavoidable topics." USA Today wrote that the album "establishes the 24-year-old as a precociously graceful and thoughtful songwriter."

Track listing

Personnel
Noah Gundersen – vocals, guitar
Abby Gundersen – violin, piano, cello
Jonathan Gundersen – drums
Elizabeth Gundersen – vocals
Seattle Studio Litho – production, recording

References

2014 debut albums
Noah Gundersen albums